Nemapogon quercicolella is a moth of the family Tineidae. It is found in Eastern Europe.

The moth flies in June depending on the location.

The larvae feed on mushrooms and fungus.

References

Nemapogoninae
Moths of Europe
Moths described in 1852